Charles Stewart Anderson (29 December 1881 – 1 March 1943) was an Irish cricketer. He was a right-handed batsman and bowled both right-arm medium-pace and off-breaks. He played just once for Ireland, a first-class match against Oxford University in 1926. He had little success in the match, as he was dismissed without scoring and bowled 13 overs without taking a wicket.

References
Cricket Archive profile
Cricinfo profile
CricketEurope Stats Zone profile

1881 births
1943 deaths
Irish cricketers
People from Holywood, County Down
Cricketers from Northern Ireland